Carl Gottlieb Samuel Heun (20 March 1771 – 2 August 1854), better known by his pen name Heinrich Clauren, was a German author.

Biography 
Born on 20 March 1771 in Doberlug, Lower Lusatia. Heun went into the Prussian civil service, and wrote in his spare time. He published under the pseudonym H. Clauren (an anagram of Carl Heun), and became one of the most popular authors of fiction for the middle class in the first half of the nineteenth century.

In 1825, Wilhelm Hauff published a parody of Heun's novels,  ('The Man in the Moon'), imitating his style, and published under his pen name H. Clauren. Heun brought a lawsuit against Hauff, and won, leading Hauff to write another book,  (1826), successfully destroying the reputation of Heun's works.

He died on 2 August 1854 in Berlin.

Influence 
One of Heun's short stories, "", was translated for the French ghost story anthology Fantasmagoriana (1812). Fantasmagoriana was read by Lord Byron, Mary Shelley, Percy Bysshe Shelley, John William Polidori and Claire Clairmont at the Villa Diodati in Cologny, Switzerland during 1816, the Year Without a Summer, and inspired them to write their own ghost stories, including "The Vampyre" (1819), and Frankenstein (1818), both of which went on to shape the Gothic horror genre. A. J. Day describes how many themes and ideas in Frankenstein are a reflection of Fantasmagoriana, and uses passages from Heun's "" to compare to both the novel and Shelley's recollection of her inspiration in the preface to the novel.

Another of his short stories, "", may have been one of the sources of inspiration for Edgar Allan Poe's "The Fall of the House of Usher" (1839), as translated by Joseph Hardman as "The Robber's Tower" in Blackwood's Magazine.

In Thomas Mann's Buddenbrooks (1901), the young Miss Antonie Buddenbrook is found reading Clauren's novel Mimili.

Translations 

A number of Clauren's stories have been translated into English:
 "" and "" were translated by John Kortz as "Northern Love" and "The Humours of Love" in Interesting Memoirs of Four German Gentlemen (1819)
 "" was translated anonymously as "The Apparition" in The Repository of Arts (1821)
 "" was translated anonymously as "The Green Mantle of Venice: A True Story" in The Repository of Arts (1821–1822)
  was translated anonymously in Forget Me Not for 1824
  was translated by James David Haas as Liesli: A Swiss Tale (1826)
 "" was freely translated by Joseph Hardman as "The Robber's Tower" in Blackwood's Magazine (1828)
 "" was translated by Marjorie Bowen as "The Grey Chamber" in Great Tales of Horror (1933), and again by A. J. Day as "The Grey Room" in Fantasmagoriana: Tales of the Dead (2005).

See also 
 Christian Köhler, an artist, originally Heun's stableboy

References 

1771 births
1854 deaths
People from Doberlug-Kirchhain
German male writers